The 2017 Remus F3 Cup was the 36th Austria Formula 3 Cup season and the fifth Remus F3 Cup season.

Teams and drivers
All Cup cars were built between 2008 and 2011, while Trophy cars were built between 1992 and 2007.

Numbers used at Remus F3 Cup events listed; numbers used at races run to F2 Italian Trophy and/or MSV F3 Cup regulations displayed in tooltips.

Calendar & Race results
Round 2, 4 and 7 (Imola, Spa-Francorchamps and Mugello) were held together with the F2 Italian Trophy. The MSV F3 Cup joined both series at Spa-Francorchamps. However, neither Italian F2 Trophy drivers nor MSV F3 Cup competitors were eligible to score Remus F3 Cup points.

Championship standings

Cup

Trophy

German F3 Trophy

Swiss F3 Cup

References

External links
Website of the AFR Cups [German]

Austria Formula 3 Cup
Remus F3 Cup
Remus F3 Cup